The Iowa State Cyclones football program is a college football team that represents Iowa State University in the Big 12 Conference in the National Collegiate Athletic Association. The team has had 33 head coaches since organized football at the school began in 1892, and was officially sanctioned in 1894. Originally, the Iowa Agricultural College teams were known as the Cardinals. The name was changed after September 29, 1895, when under coach Pop Warner, the Cardinals defeated the Northwestern Wildcats, 36–0. Inspired by an extremely active tornado (then known as a "cyclone") season, the next day, the Chicago Tribune headline read: "Struck by a Cyclone." The article went on to say, "Northwestern might as well have tried to play football with an Iowa cyclone as with the Iowa team it met yesterday." Since then the Iowa State teams have been known as the Cyclones.

Iowa State has played in 1,265 games during its 130 seasons. In those seasons, five coaches have led the Cyclones to postseason bowl games: Johnny Majors, Earle Bruce, Dan McCarney, Paul Rhoads and Matt Campbell.  Clyde Williams won two conference championships with the Cyclones.  McCarney is the all-time leader in games coached (141), years coached (11) and wins (56), while Bert German is the all-time leader in winning percentage (.833). W. P. Finney has the lowest winning percentage (.000) having no wins.

Both Warner and Bruce have been inducted into the College Football Hall of Fame.  Majors, Bruce, McCarney and Campbell have each received the Coach of the Year Award from their respective conference.  The current coach is Matt Campbell, who was hired November 29, 2015.  Matt Campbell has received the Big 12 Conference Coach of the Year Award for 2017, 2018 and 2020.  For the 2020 season, Matt Campbell led Iowa State to an 8-1 conference leading, regular season record and its first berth in the conference championship game.

Key

Coaches

Iowa State football coaching records accurate as of January 2, 2022.

See also
Iowa State Cyclones football
History of Iowa State Cyclones football
List of Iowa State Cyclones football All-Americans
Iowa State Cyclones football statistical leaders
List of Iowa State Cyclones in the NFL Draft

Notes

References
General

Specific

Lists of college football head coaches
Iowa sports-related lists